Legend of Awakening is a 2020 Chinese streaming television series based on the novel of the same name by Hudie Lan; starring Chen Feiyu, Xiong Ziqi, Deng Enxi and Cheng Xiao. It started airing on IQIYI and Mango TV on April 23. It is available on iQIYI with multi-languages subtitles (English, Thai, Bahasa Malaysia, Vietnamese, Indonesian, Spanish)

Synopsis 
During the Five Dynasties and Ten Kingdoms era, the people were being ravaged by beasts so they began cultivating as a means of self-protection. Four young heroes begin on a journey towards awakening.

Cast 
Chen Feiyu as Lu Ping
Xiong Ziqi as Yan Xifan 
Cheng Xiao as Qin Sang 
Deng Enxi as Su Tang 
Yu Yijie

Production
The drama was filmed from August 2018 to January 2019 at Xinjiang, Yinchuan and Hengdian World Studios.

The drama is directed by Vicky Wong, with Gordon Chan acting as the executive producer.
Gao Bin (Brotherhood of Blades) is in charge of the styling and costumes for the drama.

References 

2019 web series debuts
Chinese web series
Youku original programming
Chinese fantasy television series
Chinese wuxia television series
Television shows based on Chinese novels
2020 Chinese television series debuts
Mango TV original programming
IQIYI original programming